Georgetown County School District is a school district serving Georgetown County, South Carolina, United States. It is based in  Georgetown, South Carolina.
H. Randall Dozier has been the superintendent since 2003.

Schools

Elementary schools
Andrews Elementary School
Brown's Ferry Elementary School
Kensington Elementary School
Maryville Elementary School
McDonald Elementary School
Plantersville Elementary School
Pleasant Hill Elementary School
Sampit Elementary School
Waccamaw   Elementary School

Intermediate school 
Waccamaw Intermediate School

Middle schools 
Carvers Bay Middle School
Georgetown Middle School
Rosemary Middle School
Waccamaw Middle School

High schools 
Andrews High School
Carvers Bay High School
Georgetown High School
Waccamaw High School

Adult education 
Howard Adult Center

Historic Schools
Howard High School
Winyah High School 
J.B. Beck Middle School

External links

School districts in South Carolina